The Sacred Hearts Church is a Catholic church located at 2086 Independencia Street, in El Almendral neighborhood, in Valparaíso, Chile. Staffed by the Congregation of the Sacred Hearts of Jesus and Mary, it was built to serve as the church for the Colegio de los Sagrados Corazones de Valparaíso community. The church was declared as a National Monument of Chile in 2003, within the category of Historic Monuments.

History 
Ship Sylphide arrived in Valparaíso on May 13, 1834 from Bordeaux, France, bringing as passengers four priests of the Congregation of the Sacred Hearts of Jesus and Mary whose final destination was the Gambier Islands, in the French Polynesia. Chrysostome Liausu was the only of them who remained residing in Valparaíso. He formed the first community of the congregation in a port of South America.

In 1837 Liausu was authorized by the Cabildo of the city to create a school, thus establishing the first private school in the independent Chile, namely the Colegio de los Sagrados Corazones de Valparaíso. In 1840, the school was moved to a site on Independencia Street, its current location, which was later enlarged by purchases of adjoining lands. A chapel was built on the site.

In late 1860, the father Oliver ordered the construction of a new church, which was designed by architects Lucien Hénault and Arturo Mecking. The foundation stone was laid on May 3, 1868. The architect Juan Eduardo Fehrman took over the final construction stage between 1870 and 1872.  The church was inaugurated on February 6, 1874, despite having an unfinished tower.

The 2010 Chile earthquake badly damaged the church. As a result, it had to be repaired. The restoration work included the reparation of cracked walls, repainting of interior walls, and restoration of facades. The work lasted approximately a year at a cost of $240 million, half funded by a restoration program from the National Council of Culture and the Arts.

Description 
Located on Independencia Street, between Freire and Rodríguez streets, the church and the adjoining school have similar architectural styles and occupy an entire city block front. The facade is Romanesque and Gothic Revival in style, while the interior has a Gothic character.

The interior of the church includes an image named Cristo Tradicional, which was carved by an Ecuadorian artist, who was visiting his son, a member of the congregation, in Valparaíso.

References 
 

1874 in Chile
Buildings and structures in Valparaíso
Gothic Revival church buildings in Chile
Romanesque Revival architecture in Chile
19th-century Roman Catholic church buildings in Chile
Romanesque Revival church buildings